Wark Forest is the southern part of Kielder Forest in Northumberland, England. Wark Forest is found within the south-west tip of Northumberland National Park. It is near the village of Wark on Tyne to the south.

Forests and woodlands of Northumberland